The Everitt–Cox House is a historic house located at 418 Moore in Lufkin, Texas.  Built in 1892 in a simple Victorian style, the house was remodeled in 1922 with Classical Revival details designed by architect Shirley Simons.  It was listed on the National Register of Historic Places in 1988.

See also

National Register of Historic Places listings in Angelina County, Texas

References

Houses on the National Register of Historic Places in Texas
Victorian architecture in Texas
Neoclassical architecture in Texas
Houses completed in 1892
Houses in Angelina County, Texas
Lufkin, Texas
National Register of Historic Places in Angelina County, Texas